The Catmull–Clark algorithm is a technique used in 3D computer graphics to create curved surfaces by using subdivision surface modeling. It was devised by Edwin Catmull and Jim Clark in 1978 as a generalization of bi-cubic uniform B-spline surfaces to arbitrary topology.

In 2005, Edwin Catmull, together with Tony DeRose and Jos Stam, received an Academy Award for Technical Achievement for their invention and application of subdivision surfaces. DeRose wrote about "efficient, fair interpolation" and character animation. Stam described a technique for a direct evaluation of the limit surface without recursion.

Recursive evaluation 
Catmull–Clark surfaces are defined recursively, using the following refinement scheme.

Start with a mesh of an arbitrary polyhedron. All the vertices in this mesh shall be called original points.
 For each face, add a face point
 Set each face point to be the average of all original points for the respective face
 For each edge, add an edge point.
 Set each edge point to be the average of the two neighbouring face points (AF) and the midpoint of the edge (ME) 
 For each original point (P), take the average (F) of all n (recently created) face points for faces touching P, and take the average (R) of all n edge midpoints for original edges touching P, where each edge midpoint is the average of its two endpoint vertices (not to be confused with new edge points above). (Note that from the perspective of a vertex P, the number of edges neighboring P is also the number of adjacent faces, hence n)
Move each original point to the new vertex point   (This is the barycenter of P, R and F with respective weights (n − 3), 2 and 1)
Form edges and faces in the new mesh
Connect each new face point to the new edge points of all original edges defining the original face
 Connect each new vertex point to the new edge points of all original edges incident on the original vertex 
 Define new faces as enclosed by edges

Properties 
The new mesh will consist only of quadrilaterals, which in general will not be planar. The new mesh will generally look "smoother" (i.e. less "jagged" or "pointy") than the old mesh. Repeated subdivision results in meshes that are more and more rounded.

The arbitrary-looking barycenter formula was chosen by Catmull and Clark based on the aesthetic appearance of the resulting surfaces rather than on a mathematical derivation, although they do go to great lengths to rigorously show that the method converges to bicubic B-spline surfaces.

It can be shown that the limit surface obtained by this refinement process is at least  at extraordinary vertices and  everywhere else (when n indicates how many derivatives are continuous, we speak of  continuity). After one iteration, the number of extraordinary points on the surface remains constant.

Exact evaluation 
The limit surface of Catmull–Clark subdivision surfaces can also be evaluated directly, without any recursive refinement. This can be accomplished by means of the technique of Jos Stam (1998). This method reformulates the recursive refinement process into a matrix exponential problem, which can be solved directly by means of matrix diagonalization.

Software using the algorithm 

 3ds Max
 3D-Coat
 AC3D
 Anim8or
 AutoCAD
 Blender
 Carrara
 CATIA (Imagine and Shape)
 CGAL
 Cheetah3D
 Cinema4D
 Clara.io
 Creo (Freestyle)
 Daz Studio, 2.0
 DeleD Community Edition
 DeleD Designer
 Gelato
 Hammer
 Hexagon
 Houdini

 LightWave 3D, version 9
 Makehuman
 Maya
 Metasequoia
 MODO
 Mudbox
 Power Surfacing add-in for SolidWorks
 Pixar's OpenSubdiv
 PRMan
 Realsoft3D
 Remo 3D
 Shade
 Rhinoceros 3D - Grasshopper 3D Plugin - Weaverbird Plugin
 Silo
 SketchUp - Requires a Plugin.
 Softimage XSI
 Strata 3D CX

 Wings 3D
 Zbrush

See also 
 Conway polyhedron notation - A set of related topological polyhedron and polygonal mesh operators.
Doo-Sabin subdivision surface
Loop subdivision surface

References

Further reading
 
 
  preprint
 Matthias Nießner, Charles Loop, Mark Meyer, Tony DeRose, "Feature Adaptive GPU Rendering of Catmull-Clark Subdivision Surfaces", ACM Transactions on Graphics Volume 31 Issue 1, January 2012, demo
 Nießner, Matthias ; Loop, Charles ; Greiner, Günther: Efficient Evaluation of Semi-Smooth Creases in Catmull-Clark Subdivision Surfaces: Eurographics 2012 Annex: Short Papers (Eurographics 2012, Cagliary). 2012, pp 41–44.
 Wade Brainerd, Tessellation in Call of Duty: Ghosts also presented as a SIGGRAPH2014 tutorial 
D. Doo and M. Sabin: Behavior of recursive division surfaces near extraordinary points, Computer-Aided Design, 10 (6) 356–360 (1978), (doi, pdf)

3D computer graphics
Multivariate interpolation